Rósa Björk Brynjólfsdóttir (born 9 February 1975) is an Icelandic politician who is a member of the Althing (Iceland's parliament) for the Southwest Constituency since 2016 and she has also worked as a media representative of the Ministry of Finance from 2010 to 2014.

She left the Left-Green Movement in 2020, due to dissatisfaction with the policy of Katrín Jakobsdóttir's  policies on matters of refugees and asylum seekers.

References

External links 

 Biography of Rósa Björk Brynjólfsdóttir on the parliament website (Icelandic)

Living people
1975 births
21st-century Icelandic politicians
21st-century Icelandic women politicians
Rósa Björk Brynjólfsdóttir
Rósa Björk Brynjólfsdóttir
Rósa Björk Brynjólfsdóttir
Rósa Björk Brynjólfsdóttir